Conversations with a Killer: The Ted Bundy Tapes is an American documentary that premiered on Netflix on January 24, 2019, the 30th anniversary of Bundy's execution. Created and directed by Joe Berlinger, the four episodes ranging from 51 to 74 minutes long were sourced from over 100 hours of interviews and archival footage of serial killer Ted Bundy, as well as interviews with his family, friends, surviving victims, and the law enforcement members who worked on his case.

Summary 
The series chronologically traces Bundy's life, crimes, arrests, his escapes and death in detail. Archival footage, police evidence, personal photos, and Stephen Michaud's 1980 death row interviews are all present in the series. People related to the Bundy case include surviving victims, witnesses, his family and former friends, along with officers, officials, and journalists.

Episodes

Cases covered

Chi Omega homicide 
After escaping the Garfield County Jail in Colorado Springs, Bundy made his way to Florida, where he attacked the Chi Omega sorority house at Florida State University. He brutally beat up four women and killed two, Lisa Levy and Margaret Bowman. He also sexually assaulted Levy. Bundy fled the scene, but left a trace evidence which later connected him to the homicides: a double bite mark on the buttocks of Levy. A month later, Bundy was arrested by Pensacola Police when officers became suspicious of his driving. Upon finding several stolen credit cards, Bundy finally revealed his name to police. The murders at the Chi Omega house caught their attention, and they suspected Bundy was connected to the series of murders of young women all over the country. Leon County sheriff W. Kenneth Katsaris decided to try to match the bite marks found on Levy's body to Bundy's teeth. Orthodontists took a mold of Bundy's teeth and called in Dr. Richard Souviron, a forensic odontologist, on the witness stand in court to state whether the bite marks found on Levy matched. After Souviron confirmed the match, the jury spent six hours in deliberation to decide if the defendant was guilty, and ultimately found him guilty of first degree murder.

Abduction and murder of Kimberly Leach 

Before he was arrested by the Pensacola police, Bundy abducted another victim – 12-year old Kimberly Leach, who disappeared during the school day on February 9, 1978. Two months after her disappearance, Leach's body was found in a shed. The 12-year-old victim had been assaulted and murdered. In 1980, Bob Dekle, a prosecutor who was fighting the case against Bundy, connected Bundy to Leach's case by evidence found in Bundy's van and on clothes he supposedly wore on the day he killed Leach that matched the clothing fibers from Leach's clothes. Witnesses reported seeing a little girl walk with a man who resembled Bundy towards a white van. With this evidence, a jury found Bundy guilty, and he was again given the death penalty.

Confession and death penalty 
On January 22, 1989, two days prior to his execution, Bundy confessed to killing around thirty women.

Critical response 
The series received mixed reviews from critics. On review aggregator Rotten Tomatoes, the show holds an approval rating of 54%, with an average rating of 5.88/10 based on 24 reviews. The site's critical consensus reads, "Laced with troubling irony, Conversations with a Killer: The Ted Bundy Tapes skirts introspection, making it just as illusive as its subject." On Metacritic, which uses a weighted average, the series has a score of 55 based on reviews from 6 critics, indicating "mixed or average reviews".

In Vulture, Matt Zoller Seitz wrote that he was a little disappointed in the series. He wrote that though he appreciated the "weaving" of news reports, images and basic interviews, just because Stephen Michaud was not able to figure Bundy's motives does not mean that the series lost its purpose.

See also
 Extremely Wicked, Shockingly Evil and Vile
 The Stranger Beside Me

References

External links
 
 
 
 

2019 American television series debuts
2019 American television series endings
2010s American documentary television series
Documentary television series about crime in the United States
English-language Netflix original programming
Netflix original documentary television series
Television series created by Joe Berlinger
Cultural depictions of Ted Bundy